"Deirdre" is a song by the American rock band the Beach Boys from their 1970 album Sunflower. Believed to be written primarily by Bruce Johnston, it is a love song named after the sister of one of his ex-girlfriends, and is one of his two main song contributions on the album, the other being "Tears in the Morning". Although Johnson has claimed that co-writer Brian Wilson's contributions were minimal, Beach Boys historians Andrew G. Doe and John Tobler have asserted that the song was "developed from a musical theme first used in 'We're Together Again,'" a 1968 composition credited to Brian and unrelated singer Ron Wilson.

In 1971, "Deirdre" was issued as the B-side of the "Long Promised Road" single. The single never charted in the US or the UK. In 1977, Johnston rerecorded the song for his solo album Going Public. The song was released by CBS in the UK as a single in 1977 (with "Thank You Baby" – also from the album – on the B-side) but although it got some airplay, it never charted.  In addition to Deirdre, the album Going Public also featured "Disney Girls" and "Pipeline", which later became singles. Like the rest of the Album, Deirdre was produced by Gary Usher, who had produced numerous surf group albums (including several for the Beach Boys) and had also produced multiple albums for The Byrds.

Background
"Deirdre" was named after the sister of one of Johnston's ex-girlfriends. Biographer Timothy White described the song as "a stroll-tempo devotional to an idealized, red-haired goddess; its stippled use of flutes plus the spacey filtering and compression techniques in the vocal mixes giving the track a celestial grandeur." Wilson's contributions were limited to four lines in the lyrics. Asked about the song in 2013, Johnston explained:

The song was recorded at Gold Star Studios on February 21 and March 21, 1969. In 2021, the instrumental track was included on the band's box set Feel Flows.

Reception
In their review of Sunflower, a Rolling Stone critic mentioned that the song "could be Beach Boys-influenced anybody". Reviewing the song for AllMusic, Matthew Greenwald wrote, "Taking his cues from 1930s-'40s musicals, this lighthearted pop gem is a great example of Bruce Johnston's musical style and fine overall pop sensibility."

Later in the 1970s, after he had launched a solo career, Johnston said in an interview that he regretted recording the song as a track by the Beach Boys.

In popular culture
 In 1994, "Deirdre" was used as a music sample in the video game EarthBound. A sample of the a capella intro of the song is arranged into the music for the Cave of the Past area near the end of the game.

Personnel
Sourced from Craig Slowinski and Timothy White.

The Beach Boys
 Al Jardine – harmony and backing vocals
Bruce Johnston – lead vocals, opening multi-tracked harmonies, harmony and backing vocals, production
 Mike Love – harmony and backing vocals
 Brian Wilson – harmony and backing vocals
 Carl Wilson – harmony and backing vocals

Additional personnel

Production staff
 Stephen Desper – engineer
 Doc Siegel – engineer

References

1970 songs
1971 singles
The Beach Boys songs
Songs written by Brian Wilson
Songs written by Bruce Johnston
Song recordings produced by the Beach Boys